Purunakatak is a small town and a semi-urban region in Boudh district, Odisha, India.

Geography

Location
National Highway 57 passes through Purunakatak.

References

External links
 About Purunakatak
 Satellite map of Purunakatak

Cities and towns in Boudh district